Flapjax is a programming language built on JavaScript. It provides a spreadsheet-like reactive programming, dataflow computing style, termed functional reactive programming, making it easy to create reactive web pages without the burden of callbacks and potentially inconsistent mutation. Flapjax can be viewed in two ways: either as a library, for use in regular JavaScript programs, or as a new language that the compiler converts into generic JavaScript. In either case, the resulting programs can be run in a regular web browser. Flapjax comes with persistent storage and a simple application programming interface (API) that masks the complexity of using Ajax, and sharing and access control (AC) for server data.

It is free and open-source software released under a 3-clause BSD license.

The Flapjax compiler is written in the language Haskell.

References

Further reading 
 Leo Meyerovich, Arjun Guha, Jacob Baskin, Greg Cooper, Michael Greenberg, Aleks Bromfield, Shriram Krishnamurthi".Flapjax: A Programming Language for Ajax Applications". OOPSLA 2009. 
 Leo Meyerovich, Arjun Guha, Jacob Baskin, Greg Cooper, Michael Greenberg, Aleks Bromfield, Shriram Krishnamurthi. "Flapjax: A Programming Language for Ajax Applications". Brown University Tech Report CS-09-04.
 Arjun Guha, Shriram Krishnamurthi, Trevor Jim".Using Static Analysis for Ajax intrusion Detection". WWW 2009.
 Arjun Guha, Jacob Matthews, Robert Bruce Findler, Shriram Krishnamurthi".Relationally-Parametric Polymorphic Contracts". DLS 2007.

External links
 
 

Scripting languages
Reactive programming languages